Hudson/Innes station is a light rail station on the Muni Metro T Third Street line in the Bayview neighborhood of San Francisco, California. The station opened with the T Third Street line on January 13, 2007. It has a single island platform located in the median of Third Street between Hudson Avenue and Innes Avenue, with access from crosswalks at both streets.

References

External links 

SFMTA: Third Street & Hudson/Innes northbound, southbound
SF Bay Transit (unofficial): Third Street/Hudson/Innes

Muni Metro stations
Railway stations in the United States opened in 2007